Stu Townsend (born 11 October 1995) is a scrum-half playing professional rugby union for Exeter Chiefs in Premiership Rugby.

Early life

Born in Torbay, Townsend was first introduced to rugby as a six-year-old at his local club Kingsbridge, he was educated at the local Primary and Community College before attending Ivybridge Community College, where he joined the Exeter Chiefs Academy system.

Early career 

Townsend featured for England at various age levels, including that of the Under-20s, and also in the National Leagues with both Taunton Titans and the Cornish Pirates.

Exeter Chiefs
After playing regularly in the Championship Townsend was recalled to the Chiefs squad midway through the 16/17 season after injuries to fellow nines, Dave Lewis and Will Chudley.

After a number of appearances off the bench both in the Premiership and Europe, on his first full starting appearance he scored a try against Leicester Tigers at Welford Road.

He started the final as Exeter Chiefs defeated Wasps to be crowned champions of the 2016-17 English Premiership.

He scored a try for Exeter in the second minute of the semi-final against Newcastle Falcons to help book a place in the final of the Anglo-Welsh Cup for Exeter to be played against Bath Rugby on the 18 March 2018. The final was rearranged to March 30 due to snow and Townsend played as the Chiefs won 28-11.

References 

1995 births
Exeter Chiefs players
Living people
Rugby union scrum-halves